Sarah Healy (born 13 February 2001 in Monkstown) is an Irish middle-distance runner. She won gold for the 1500m and 3000m at the 2018 European Athletics U18 Championships in Győr, Hungary. Healy also won silver in the 1500m the following year. She won the Irish National Cross Country Championships in November 2022.

References

External links
 
 
 
 

2001 births
Living people
Irish female middle-distance runners
Irish female cross country runners
Sportspeople from County Dublin
Athletes (track and field) at the 2020 Summer Olympics
Olympic athletes of Ireland
21st-century Irish women